Parque Deportivo Veracruzano was a multi-use stadium in Veracruz, Mexico. It was initially used as the stadium of Rojos del Águila de Veracruz and Tiburones Rojos de Veracruz matches.  It was replaced by Estadio Universitario Beto Ávila in 2006 for Rojos del Águila de Veracruz and Estadio Luis de la Fuente in 1967 for the Tiburones Rojos de Veracruz .  The capacity of the stadium was 12,000 spectators.

External links
 Stadium history

1957 establishments in Mexico
2006 disestablishments in Mexico
Defunct baseball venues
Defunct football venues in Mexico
Sports venues in Veracruz
Veracruz (city)
Baseball venues in Mexico
History of baseball in Mexico